Darreh Seheh (also Romanized as Darreh Şeḩeh) is a village in Zilayi Rural District, Margown District, Boyer-Ahmad County, Kohgiluyeh and Boyer-Ahmad Province, Iran. At the 2006 census, its population was 210, in 42 families.

References 

Populated places in Boyer-Ahmad County